Peter Vincent Kearns (26 March 1937 – 6 July 2014) was an English footballer who scored 83 goals from 296 appearances in the Football League playing for Plymouth Argyle, Aldershot and Lincoln City. He played as an inside forward. He also played non-league football for Wellingborough Town and Corby Town, and finished his career with two seasons in the Southern League with Weymouth, where he was a director in the 1990s.

Kearns had been receiving treatment for dementia in the early 2010s and in support of his cause, his granddaughter, Hollie Kearns (aged 19 at the time) participated in a sky dive on Saturday 2 November 2013 to raise funds to find a cure. Overall she raised £700. Kearns died in a Weymouth, Dorset, care home on 6 July 2014 at the age of 77.

References

1937 births
2014 deaths
Sportspeople from Aldershot
English footballers
Association football inside forwards
Wellingborough Town F.C. players
Plymouth Argyle F.C. players
Corby Town F.C. players
Aldershot F.C. players
Lincoln City F.C. players
Weymouth F.C. players
English Football League players
Southern Football League players
Deaths from dementia in England
Footballers from Hampshire